Indrek Saar (born February 20, 1973) is an Estonian actor and politician, leader of the Social Democratic Party, and former Minister of Culture.

Saar attended secondary school in Kuressaare and graduated from the Estonian Academy of Music and Higher Drama (now, the Estonian Academy of Music and Theatre) in Tallinn. He was an actor and director of the Rakvere Theatre from 1996 until 2005. From 2002 until 2007, he was Deputy Chairman of Rakvere City Council. Between 2004 and 2005, he was a theater director and advisor at the NO99 theatre and from 2006 to 2007, he was a chief executive officer at the NO99 theatre and the Vanalinnastuudio theatre.

From 1995 until 2015, he played the role of Raim Raidver on the long-running ETV television drama series Õnne 13.

Saar was first chosen to Riigikogu in 2007 election with 1,855 votes. He was chosen again in the 2011 and 2015 elections, with 3,931 and 1,944 votes respectively. In 2019, he was again elected to the Riigikogu.

Saar is married to actress Ülle Lichtfeldt. The couple have two children.

References 

1973 births
Living people
People from Kuressaare
Social Democratic Party (Estonia) politicians
Members of the Riigikogu, 2007–2011
Members of the Riigikogu, 2011–2015
Members of the Riigikogu, 2015–2019
Members of the Riigikogu, 2019–2023
Ministers of Culture of Estonia
Estonian male stage actors
Estonian male television actors
Estonian Academy of Music and Theatre alumni
20th-century Estonian male actors
21st-century Estonian male actors
21st-century Estonian politicians